Belgern, is a town in the district Nordsachsen, in Saxony, Germany. It is located on the left bank of the Elbe, 12 km southeast of Torgau and 55 km east of Leipzig. Since 1 January 2013, it is part of the town Belgern-Schildau.

References 

Nordsachsen
Former municipalities in Saxony